Noboru (written: , , , ,  in hiragana or  katakana) is a masculine Japanese given name. Notable people with the name include:

, official in the government of Japan's Okinawa Prefecture
, former professional sumo wrestler and current politician from Ulaanbaatar, Mongolia
, Japanese folklorist
, Nippon Professional Baseball pitcher
, Japanese film actor known for his yakuza roles
, animator who was born in Tokyo, Japan
, Japanese biologist, medical doctor and professor of medicine
, Japanese manga artist
Noboru Kikuta (菊田 昇, 19261991), Japanese gynecologist
, Japanese former politician
Noboru Misawa, anime director and storyboard artist in Japan
, Japanese film director and screenwriter
, former Japanese football player
, Japanese hammer thrower
, Japanese manga artist
, Japanese singer, actor, and voice actor
, Japanese footballer
, Japanese professional golfer
, Japanese freestyle swimmer who competed in the 1932 Summer Olympics
, Japanese politician and the 74th Prime Minister of Japan (1987 to 1989)
, Japanese film director
, Japanese field hockey player
, Japanese freestyle swimmer
, prize-winning Japanese author of fiction
, Japanese boxer
, former Grand Prix motorcycle road racer
, Japanese photographer
, Japanese swimmer
, the second kumicho, or Godfather, of the Yamaguchi-gumi yakuza gang in Japan
, male Japanese light novel and game scenario author
, professional sumo wrestler from Ulan-Bator, Mongolia

Fictional characters
, a character in the tokusatsu series Kamen Rider Blade
, a character in the manga/anime series Great Teacher Onizuka

See also
4807 Noboru, a main-belt asteroid

Japanese masculine given names